Chance Operations or chance operations may refer to:
 Chance Operations, a subsidiary of Chance Industries
 Chance operations, the generation of aleatoric music, independent of the composer's will

See also
 Some Chance Operations, an essay-film by Renée Green, about Italian filmmaker Elvira Notari